Queens' College Chapel Choir, Cambridge is the choir of Queens' College, Cambridge, England. It is a mixed collegiate Chapel Choir composed both of Choral Scholars and volunteers from across Cambridge University. Between 2011 and 2015 the choir was run by Director of Music, Silas Wollston, and two undergraduate organ scholars. Between 2015 and 2022 most services were directed by British conductor Ralph Allwood. Nicholas Morris joined the college as Director of Music in September 2022.

About the choir 
Until October 2008, the choir was run by the organ scholars, who were responsible for music in Chapel and the recruiting, training and conducting of the Choir. Since then, the Director of Music has been responsible for conducting the chapel choir, and, in turn, tutoring and mentoring the organ scholars. Additionally the choir employs two singing teachers to aid in the training of the choral scholars and volunteers.

The Choir meets three times per week during full term, singing choral evensongs on Wednesday and Sunday evenings, and compline on a Friday. The choir also performs concerts, and sings at special services, such as Eucharists on feast days, the college's Commemoration of Benefactors, weddings and memorial services.  The Choir tours regularly, singing for services around the country in cathedrals such as Westminster Abbey (2017), Canterbury Cathedral (2008), Southwell Minster and Truro Cathedral (2005). The choir also travels on international tours further afield on an annual basis.  The Choir has recorded with three labels: Guild Music, Past Times, and Orchid Classics.  The Choir's most recent recordings have been with Orchid Classics.

The choir appoints up to four choral scholars a year; scholarships are usually awarded to undergraduate applicants of the college who partake in the University choral trials which take place in September. Choral volunteers are appointed by audition at the start of the academic year and come from a large range of the university's colleges.

Discography 
  For the Wings of a Dove Orchid Classics (2015)
  And Comes The Day: Carols and Antiphons for Advent Orchid Classics (2012)
 Love and Honour Guild Music (2005)
 Songs of Heaven and Earth Guild Music (2003)
 Flight of Song Guild Music (2001)
 Christmas from Cambridge Past Times (1999)
 Wedding Hymns Guild Music (1999)
 Evening Watch Guild Music (1999)
 Vox Dicentis Mirabilis (1995)
 The Queen's Service Mirabilis (1994)

Tours 
 December 2007 — Hong Kong
 December 2008 — East Coast US
 March 2009 — Angers, France
 March 2010 — Sicily
 December 2010 — West and South Germany
 April 2011 — Exeter Cathedral
 December 2011 - Brussels and Ghent
 August 2012 - North Germany
 December 2012 - Paris
 March 2013 - Bury St. Edmunds
 July 2013 - Switzerland
 January 2014 - Hong Kong
 July 2015 - Budapest
 July 2016 - North France: Loire Valley and Paris
 April 2017 - East Coast US
 July 2018 - Greece: Athens and Thessaloniki
 July 2019 - France: Paris and Angers

See also 
 Queens' College, Cambridge
 Suzi Digby
 Ralph Allwood

References

Bibliography

External links 
 Queens' College Choir Official website

Chapel Choir
Culture of the University of Cambridge
Cambridge choirs
University choirs